Cubic equations of state are a specific class of thermodynamic models for modeling the pressure of a gas as a function of temperature and density and which can be rewritten as a cubic function of the molar volume. 

Equations of state are generally applied in the fields of physical chemistry and chemical engineering, particularly in the modeling of vapor–liquid equilibrium and chemical engineering process design.

Van der Waals equation of state 
The van der Waals equation of state may be written as

 

These definitions apply to all equations of state below as well.

 
 

Expressions for  written as functions of  may also be obtained and are often used to parameterize the equation because the critical temperature and pressure are readily accessible to experiment. They are

 
 

Proposed in 1873, the van der Waals equation of state was one of the first to perform markedly better than the ideal gas law. In this landmark equation  is called the attraction parameter and  the repulsion parameter or the effective molecular volume. While the equation is definitely superior to the ideal gas law and does predict the formation of a liquid phase, the agreement with experimental data is limited for conditions where the liquid forms. While the van der Waals equation is commonly referenced in textbooks and papers for historical reasons, it is now obsolete. Other modern equations of only slightly greater complexity are much more accurate.

The van der Waals equation may be considered as the ideal gas law, "improved" due to including two non-ideal contributions to the equation. Consider the van der Waals equation in the form

 

as compared to the ideal gas equation

 

The form of the van der Waals equation can be motivated as follows:
 Molecules are thought of as particles which occupy a finite volume. Thus the physical volume is not accessible to all molecules at any given moment, raising the pressure slightly compared to what would be expected for point particles.
 While ideal gas molecules do not interact, real molecules will exhibit attractive van der Waals forces if they are sufficiently close together. The attractive forces, which are proportional to the density , tend to retard the collisions that molecules have with the container walls and lower the pressure. The number of collisions that are so affected is also proportional to the density.

With the reduced state variables, i.e.

 

 

In that situation, the reduced cubic equation of state yields 3 solutions. The largest and the lowest solution are the gas and liquid reduced volume. In this situation, the Maxwell construction is sometimes used to model the pressure as a function of molar volume.

The compressibility factor  is often used to characterize non-ideal behavior. For the van der Waals equation in reduced form, this becomes

 

At the critical point, .

Redlich–Kwong equation of state 

Introduced in 1949, the Redlich–Kwong equation of state was considered to be a notable improvement to the van der Waals equation. It is still of interest primarily due to its relatively simple form. 

While superior to the van der Waals equation in some respects, it performs poorly with respect to the liquid phase and thus cannot be used for accurately calculating vapor–liquid equilibria. However, it can be used in conjunction with separate liquid-phase correlations for this purpose. The equation is given below, as are relationships between its parameters and the critical constants:

 

Another, equivalent form of the Redlich–Kwong equation is the expression of the model's compressibility factor:
 

The Redlich–Kwong equation is adequate for calculation of gas phase properties when the reduced pressure (defined in the previous section) is less than about one-half of the ratio of the temperature to the reduced temperature,

 

The Redlich–Kwong equation is consistent with the theorem of corresponding states. When the equation expressed in reduced form, an identical equation is obtained for all gases:

 

where  is:
 

In addition, the compressibility factor at the critical point is the same for every substance:
 

Soave modification of Redlich–Kwong

A modified form of the Redlich–Kwong equation was proposed by Soave.  It takes the form

 
 
 
 
 
 
 

where ω is the acentric factor for the species.

The original formulation from Soave is:

 

for hydrogen:

 

By substituting the variables in the reduced form and the compressibility factor at critical point

 

we obtain

 
 

thus leading to
 

 

We can also write it in the polynomial form, with:

 
 

In terms of the compressibility factor, we have:

 .

This equation may have up to three roots. The maximal root of the cubic equation generally corresponds to a vapor state, while the minimal root is for a liquid state. This should be kept in mind when using cubic equations in calculations, e.g., of vapor-liquid equilibrium.

In 1972 G. Soave replaced the  term of the Redlich–Kwong equation with a function α(T,ω) involving the temperature and the acentric factor (the resulting equation is also known as the Soave–Redlich–Kwong equation of state; SRK EOS). The α function was devised to fit the vapor pressure data of hydrocarbons and the equation does fairly well for these materials.

Volume translation of Peneloux et al. (1982) 
The SRK EOS may be written as

 

where

 

where  and other parts of the SRK EOS is defined in the SRK EOS section.

A downside of the SRK EOS, and other cubic EOS, is that the liquid molar volume is significantly less accurate than the gas molar volume. Peneloux et alios (1982) proposed a simple correction for this by introducing a volume translation

 

where  is an additional fluid component parameter that translates the molar volume slightly. On the liquid branch of the EOS, a small change in molar volume corresponds to a large change in pressure. On the gas branch of the EOS, a small change in molar volume corresponds to a much smaller change in pressure than for the liquid branch. Thus, the perturbation of the molar gas volume is small. Unfortunately, there are two versions that occur in science and industry.

In the first version only  is translated,  and the EOS becomes

 

This gives

 

The c-parameter of a fluid mixture is calculated by

 

The c-parameter of the individual fluid components in a petroleum gas and oil can be estimated by the correlation

 

where the Rackett compressibility factor  can be estimated by

 

A nice feature with the volume translation method of Peneloux et al. (1982) is that it does not affect the vapor–liquid equilibrium calculations. This method of volume translation can also be applied to other cubic EOSs if the c-parameter correlation is adjusted to match the selected EOS.

Peng–Robinson equation of state 
The Peng–Robinson equation of state (PR EOS) was developed in 1976 at The University of Alberta by Ding-Yu Peng and Donald Robinson in order to satisfy the following goals:

 The parameters should be expressible in terms of the critical properties and the acentric factor.
 The model should provide reasonable accuracy near the critical point, particularly for calculations of the compressibility factor and liquid density.
 The mixing rules should not employ more than a single binary interaction parameter, which should be independent of temperature, pressure, and composition.
 The equation should be applicable to all calculations of all fluid properties in natural gas processes.

The equation is given as follows:

 

In polynomial form:

 
 
 

For the most part the Peng–Robinson equation exhibits performance similar to the Soave equation, although it is generally superior in predicting the liquid densities of many materials, especially nonpolar ones. The departure functions of the Peng–Robinson equation are given on a separate article.

The analytic values of its characteristic constants are:

Peng–Robinson–Stryjek–Vera equations of state

PRSV1 
A modification to the attraction term in the Peng–Robinson equation of state published by Stryjek and Vera in 1986 (PRSV) significantly improved the model's accuracy by introducing an adjustable pure component parameter and by modifying the polynomial fit of the acentric factor.

The modification is:

 

where  is an adjustable pure component parameter.  Stryjek and Vera published pure component parameters for many compounds of industrial interest in their original journal article. At reduced temperatures above 0.7, they recommend to set  and simply use . For alcohols and water the value of  may be used up to the critical temperature and set to zero at higher temperatures.

PRSV2 
A subsequent modification published in 1986 (PRSV2) further improved the model's accuracy by introducing two additional pure component parameters to the previous attraction term modification.

The modification is:

 

PRSV2 is particularly advantageous for VLE calculations.  While PRSV1 does offer an advantage over the Peng–Robinson model for describing thermodynamic behavior, it is still not accurate enough, in general, for phase equilibrium calculations.  The highly non-linear behavior of phase-equilibrium calculation methods tends to amplify what would otherwise be acceptably small errors.  It is therefore recommended that PRSV2 be used for equilibrium calculations when applying these models to a design.  However, once the equilibrium state has been determined, the phase specific thermodynamic values at equilibrium may be determined by one of several simpler models with a reasonable degree of accuracy.

One thing to note is that in the PRSV equation, the parameter fit is done in a particular temperature range which is usually below the critical temperature. Above the critical temperature, the PRSV alpha function tends to diverge and become arbitrarily large instead of tending towards 0. Because of this, alternate equations for alpha should be employed above the critical point. This is especially important for systems containing hydrogen which is often found at temperatures far above its critical point. Several alternate formulations have been proposed. Some well known ones are by Twu et al. and by Mathias and Copeman.

Peng–Robinson–Babalola equation of state (PRB) 
Babalola  modified the Peng–Robinson Equation of state as:

The attractive force parameter ‘a’ was considered to be a constant with respect to pressure in the Peng–Robinson equation of state. The modification, in which parameter ‘a’ was treated as a variable with respect to pressure for multicomponent multi-phase high density reservoir systems was to improve accuracy in the prediction of properties of complex reservoir fluids for PVT modeling. The variation was represented with a linear equation where a1 and a2 represent the slope and the intercept respectively of the straight line obtained when values of parameter ‘a’ are plotted against pressure.

This modification increases the accuracy of the Peng–Robinson equation of state for heavier fluids particularly at high pressure ranges (>30MPa) and eliminates the need for tuning the original Peng–Robinson equation of state.

Elliott–Suresh–Donohue equation of state 
The Elliott–Suresh–Donohue (ESD) equation of state was proposed in 1990. The equation seeks to correct a shortcoming in the Peng–Robinson EOS in that there was an inaccuracy in the van der Waals repulsive term. The EOS accounts for the effect of the shape of any molecule and can be directly extended to polymers with molecular parameters characterized in terms of solubility parameter and liquid volume instead of using critical properties (as shown here). The EOS itself was developed through comparisons with computer simulations and should capture the essential physics of size, shape, and hydrogen bonding.

 

where:

 

 

For non-spherical molecules, the following relation between the shape factor and the acentric factor is suggested:

 .

  is the characteristic size parameter [cm3/mol], and
  is the molar density [mol/cm3].

The characteristic size parameter is related to  through

 

where

 
 
 
 
 

The shape parameter  appearing in the attraction term and the term  are given by

  (and is hence also equal to 1 for spherical molecules).
 

where  is the depth of the square-well potential and is given by

 
  for spherical molecules (c=1)
  for spherical molecules (c=1)
  for spherical molecules (c=1)
 

The model can be extended to associating components and mixtures with non-associating components. Details are in the paper by J.R. Elliott, Jr. et al. (1990).

Noting that  = 1.900,  can be rewritten in the SAFT form as:

If preferred, the "q" can be replaced by "m" in SAFT notation and the ESD EOS can be written:

In this form, SAFT's segmental perspective is evident and all the results of Michael Wertheim are directly applicable and relatively succinct. In SAFT's segmental perspective, each molecule is conceived as comprising m spherical segments floating in space with their own spherical interactions, but then corrected for bonding into a tangent sphere chain by the (m − 1) term. When m is not an integer, it is simply considered as an "effective" number of tangent sphere segments. 

Solving the equations in Wertheim's theory can be complicated, but simplifications can make their implementation less daunting. Briefly, a few extra steps are needed to compute given density and temperature. For example, when the number of hydrogen bonding donors is equal to the number of acceptors, the ESD equation becomes:

where:

For example,   = 1 for alcohols like methanol and ethanol.   = 2 for water.   = degree of polymerization for polyvinylphenol. So you use the density and temperature to calculate  then use  to calculate the other quantities. Technically, the ESD equation is no longer cubic when the association term is included, but no artifacts are introduced so there are only three roots in density.

Cubic-plus-association 
The cubic-plus-association (CPA) equation of state combines the Soave–Redlich–Kwong equation with the association term from SAFT based on Chapman's extensions and simplifications of a theory of associating molecules due to Michael Wertheim. The development of the equation began in 1995 as a research project that was funded by Shell, and in 1996 an article was published which presented the CPA equation of state.

 

In the association term  is the mole fraction of molecules not bonded at site A.

References

Equations of state